Argyractis argentilinealis is a moth in the family Crambidae described by George Hampson in 1897. It is found in Espírito Santo, Brazil.

References

Acentropinae
Moths of South America
Moths described in 1897